Ivan Marković may refer to:

 Ivan Marković (footballer, born 1928) (1928–2006), Croatian footballer and football manager
 Ivan Marković (footballer, born 1991), Serbian footballer for Mohammédia
 Ivan Marković (footballer, born 1994), Serbian footballer for FK Rabotnički
 Ivan Markovic (footballer, born 1997), Swiss footballer for FC Spiez